East Sister can refer to:
East Sister (Nevada), the highest mountain completely within Lyon County, Nevada.
East Sister Island, an island in Lake Erie.
East Sister Island (Andaman), an island in the Andaman Archipelago of the Bay of Bengal.